Carlos Sobrinho (born 8 March 1971) is a Brazilian rower. He competed in the men's coxed pair event at the 1992 Summer Olympics.

References

External links
 

1971 births
Living people
Brazilian male rowers
Olympic rowers of Brazil
Rowers at the 1992 Summer Olympics
Place of birth missing (living people)